This article lists French regions and overseas collectivities by gross domestic product (GDP).

Introduction
INSEE and affiliate statistical offices in the overseas collectivities produce estimates of GDP in France's 13 regions and 5 overseas collectivities every year, and in some overseas collectivities where GDP estimates are made only every few years.

In 2011, France (whose territory in the national accounts refers to Metropolitan France plus the four old overseas regions of Guadeloupe, Martinique, French Guiana, and Réunion, but excludes Mayotte and the six overseas collectivities) had a GDP of US$2,778 bn, 98.2% of which was produced in Metropolitan France, and 1.8% in the four overseas regions.

Dynamics 
Île-de-France (the Paris Region) has a much higher GDP per capita than the rest of France, due to its position as one of the "command centres" for the global economy, as well as its relatively low share of retirees. Outside Île-de-France, the 12 other regions of Metropolitan France show remarkably little disparity in their GDPs per capita.

The "poorest" region of Metropolitan France outside Île-de-France in 2016, Hauts-de-France, had a GDP per capita which was four fifths the level of the richest region Auvergne-Rhône-Alpes. This is in contrast to most neighbours of France where regional disparities are much more marked (East Germany vs West Germany, southern Spain and Italy vs northern Spain and Italy, Wallonia vs Flanders).

Overseas, only Saint Barthélemy, Saint Pierre and Miquelon, and New Caledonia have GDP per capita at the level of Metropolitan French regions. All other overseas regions and collectivities have GDP per capita noticeably lower than the Metropolitan French regions. The lowest is found in Mayotte, where GDP per capita was slightly less than a quarter of Metropolitan France's level in 2009, although it has been increasing a lot in recent years with the accession of Mayotte to overseas department and region status (and soon outermost region of the European Union, thus eligible for EU structural funds from 2014 on).

Gross domestic product
Nominal GDP in euros and CFP francs has been converted to US dollars at the €/US$ purchasing power parity rate of each given year.

Notes

Per capita GDP

Figures are in US dollars at purchasing power parity (PPP).

Notes

Departments by GDP 
All 95 Departments of Metropolitan France by GDP and GDP per capita in 2015.

See also
 Economy of France
 Ranked list of French regions

References

Regions and overseas collectivities by GDP

GDP
Gross state product
France